Lyudmila Ilyinichna Maslakova (née , Zharkova; born 26 February 1952 in Astrakhan) is a Soviet athlete who competed mainly in the 100 metres.

Career 
Maslakova trained at VSS Trud in Sverdlovsk and later at Burevestnik in Moscow. She competed for the USSR in the 1968 Summer Olympics held in Mexico City, Mexico in the 4 x 100 metres where she won the bronze medal with her teammates Galina Bukharina, Vera Popkova and Lyudmila Samotyosova.

Her next Olympic medal came in the 1976 Summer Olympics held in Montreal, Quebec,  Canada again in the 4 x 100 metres where she won the bronze medal with her teammates Tatyana Prorochenko, Nadezhda Besfamilnaya and Vera Anisimova.

Her third Olympic medal came 12 years after her first in 1980 Summer Olympics held in Moscow, Soviet Union once again in the 4 x 100 metres where she improved to the silver medal with her teammates Vera Komisova, Vera Anisimova and Natalya Bochina.

References 

1952 births
Soviet female sprinters
Russian female sprinters
Burevestnik (sports society) athletes
Olympic silver medalists for the Soviet Union
Olympic bronze medalists for the Soviet Union
Athletes (track and field) at the 1968 Summer Olympics
Athletes (track and field) at the 1972 Summer Olympics
Athletes (track and field) at the 1976 Summer Olympics
Athletes (track and field) at the 1980 Summer Olympics
Olympic athletes of the Soviet Union
Living people
Sportspeople from Astrakhan
European Athletics Championships medalists
Medalists at the 1980 Summer Olympics
Medalists at the 1976 Summer Olympics
Medalists at the 1968 Summer Olympics
Olympic silver medalists in athletics (track and field)
Olympic bronze medalists in athletics (track and field)
Universiade medalists in athletics (track and field)
Universiade gold medalists for the Soviet Union
Medalists at the 1970 Summer Universiade
Medalists at the 1975 Summer Universiade
Medalists at the 1977 Summer Universiade
Olympic female sprinters